The 2021 Bury Metropolitan Borough Council election took place in 2021 to elect members of Bury Metropolitan Borough Council in England. This was on the same day as other local elections. One-third of the seats were up for election, with a total of 69 candidates standing.

Results 

|}

Ward results

Besses

Church

East

Elton

Holyrood

Moorside

North Manor

Pilkington Park

Radcliffe East

Radcliffe North

Radcliffe West

Ramsbottom

Redvales

Sedgley

St Marys

Tottington

Unsworth

References 

Bury Council elections
Bury